Douglas Brent Hegdahl III (born September 3, 1946) is a former United States Navy Petty Officer 2nd Class (E-5) who was held as a prisoner of war during the Vietnam War. After an early release, he was able to provide the names and personal information of about 256 fellow POWs, as well as reveal the conditions of the prisoner-of-war camp.

Early life and military career 
Hegdahl was born on September 3, 1946, and graduated from Clark High School in Clark, South Dakota on May 24, 1966.

He swam until he was picked up several hours later by Cambodian fishermen who treated him well. Trying to cover for him, his shipmates did not report him missing for two days, so the commanding officer did not organize a search. Hegdahl was handed over to Vietnamese militiamen who clubbed him repeatedly with their rifles before moving him to the infamous "Hanoi Hilton" prison.

The interrogators first believed that Hegdahl was a commando or an agent. His story of being blown overboard seemed unbelievable to the interrogators. Hegdahl thought he would be much better off if he pretended to be of low intelligence. Hegdahl was physically maltreated for a few days before he was able to convince his captors that he was of little value for their propaganda campaign. His bumpkin demeanor and youthful appearance aided in his ability to convince them that he was no threat to them.

When asked to write statements against the United States, he agreed, but pretended to be unable to read or write, which was believable to his Vietnamese captors. Thinking they had someone who would be easily turned to their cause, they assigned someone to teach Hegdahl to read. After Hegdahl appeared to be incapable of learning to read and write, his captors gave up on him. Later, he came to be known to the Vietnamese as "The Incredibly Stupid One", and he was given nearly free rein of the camp.

With the help of Joseph Crecca, a U.S. Air Force officer and fellow prisoner, Hegdahl memorized names, capture dates, method of capture, and personal information of about 256 other prisoners—to the tune of the nursery rhyme "Old MacDonald Had a Farm". According to his senior officer and cellmate, Lieutenant Commander Richard A. Stratton, Hegdahl also convinced his captors that he needed new glasses and memorized the route from the prison into the city of Hanoi, where he was taken to be fitted.

During his prison stay, Hegdahl disabled five trucks by putting dirt in their fuel tanks.

Hegdahl was one of three POWs (along with Navy Lieutenant Robert Frishman and Air Force Captain Wesley Rumble) who were released on August 5, 1969, as a propaganda move by the North Vietnamese. Although the POWs had agreed that none would accept early release, they agreed that Hegdahl's release should be an exception. He was ordered by Stratton to accept an early release so that he could provide the names of POWs being held by the North Vietnamese and reveal the conditions to which the prisoners were being subjected.

After his discharge, Hegdahl was sent to the Paris Peace Talks in 1970 and confronted the North Vietnamese with his first-hand information about the mistreatment of prisoners.

Postwar 
After returning to the United States, Hegdahl used his experiences as an instructor at the U.S. Navy's Survival, Evasion, Resistance and Escape school at NAS North Island, San Diego.  He left the US Navy as a Petty Officer Second Class.

His story was featured on Season 6, Episode 15 of Comedy Central's Drunk History. It was also shown on the streaming provider Amazon Prime, The Night Shift, season four, episode seven.

See also 
 Jeremiah Denton

References 

1948 births
United States Navy personnel of the Vietnam War
American prisoners of war
Living people
People from Clark, South Dakota
United States Navy sailors
Vietnam War prisoners of war